Norwood is an unincorporated community in Otter Creek Township, Lucas County, Iowa, United States.

History
Norwood's population was 31 in 1902, and was 50 in 1925.

References

Unincorporated communities in Lucas County, Iowa
Unincorporated communities in Iowa